Coffeyville USD 445 is a public unified school district headquartered in Coffeyville, Kansas, United States.  The district includes the communities of Coffeyville, Dearing, Liberty, and nearby rural areas.

Schools
The school district operates the following schools:
 Field Kindley High School
 Roosevelt Middle School
 Community Elementary School
 Dr. Jerry Hamm Early Learning Center

See also
 Kansas State Department of Education
 Kansas State High School Activities Association
 List of high schools in Kansas
 List of unified school districts in Kansas

References

External links
 

School districts in Kansas
Education in Montgomery County, Kansas